AF Columbae, also known as HD 42682, is a solitary, red hued variable star located in the southern constellation Columba, the dove. It has an apparent magnitude that fluctuates between 5.6 and 5.71. Nevertheless, it is faintly visible to the naked eye. Parallax measurements from the Gaia spacecraft place the star relatively far at a distance of 820 light years.

AF Columbae is a red giant that is currently on the asymptotic giant branch, generating energy via hydrogen and helium shell burning. It has a stellar classification of M2 II/III, indicating an evolved M-type star with the blended luminosity class of a regular giant star and a bright giant. At present it has 1.54 times the mass of the Sun but has expanded to 148 times its girth.

The object is classified as a slow irregular variable of subtype Lb. Tabur et al. (2009) found 5 periods for AF Columbae. Most of them last for 40-50 days, while one of them last for 112 days.

References

M-type giants
M-type bright giants
Slow irregular variables
Columba (constellation)
042682
029263
2203
CD-40 02291
Columbae, AF
Columbae, 82